Liam Caruana (born 22 January 1998) is an Italian-American former tennis player.

Caruana has a career high ATP singles ranking of 375 achieved on 12 February 2018. He also has a career high ATP doubles ranking of 894 achieved on 20 August 2018.

Caruana made his ATP main draw debut at the 2018 ASB Classic in the singles draw as a lucky loser.

Caruana received the Italian wildcard for the 2018 Next Generation ATP Finals in Milan after winning the wildcard playoff tournament.

External links

1998 births
Living people
American male tennis players
Italian male tennis players
Tennis players from Rome
Tennis players from Austin, Texas
Italian emigrants to the United States